The Cheliferoidea are a superfamily of pseudoscorpions.

Families
The superfamily contains the following families:

 Atemnidae Kishida, 1929 (Chamberlin, 1931?)
 Miratemnidae (Sometimes considered a subfamily of Atemnidae, Miratemninae)
 Myrmochernetidae Chamberlin, 1931 (Junior synonym of Chernetidae)
 Chernetidae Menge, 1855
 Withiidae Chamberlin, 1931
 Cheliferidae Risso, 1826

References

 
Arachnid superfamilies